Breitenau am Hochlantsch is a municipality in the district of Bruck-Mürzzuschlag in Styria, Austria.

References

Cities and towns in Bruck-Mürzzuschlag District
Fischbach Alps
Graz Highlands